A proplyd, short for ionized protoplanetary disk, is an externally illuminated photoevaporating protoplanetary disk around a young star. Nearly 180 proplyds have been discovered in the Orion Nebula. Images of proplyds in other star-forming regions are rare, while Orion is the only region with a large known sample due to its relative proximity to Earth.

History 
In 1979 observations with the Lallemand electronic camera at the Pic-du-Midi Observatory showed six unresolved high-ionization sources near the Trapezium Cluster. These sources were not interpreted as proplyds, but as partly ionized globules (PIGs). The idea was that these objects are being ionized from the outside by M42. Later observations with the Very Large Array showed solar-system-sized condensations associated with these sources. Here the idea appeared that these objects might be low-mass stars surrounded by an evaporating protostellar accretion disk.

Proplyds were clearly resolved in 1993 using images of the Hubble Space Telescope Wide Field Camera and the term "proplyd" was used.

Characteristics 

In the Orion Nebula the proplyds observed are usually one of two types. Some proplyds glow around luminous stars, in cases where the disk is found close to the star, glowing from the star's luminosity. Other proplyds are found at a greater distance from the host star and instead show up as dark silhouettes due to the self-obscuration of cooler dust and gases from the disk itself. Some proplyds show signs of movement from solar irradiance shock waves pushing the proplyds. The Orion Nebula is approximately 1,500 light-years from the Sun with very active star formation. The Orion Nebula and the Sun are in the same spiral arm of the Milky Way galaxy.

A proplyd may form new planets and planetesimal systems. Current models show that the metallicity of the star and proplyd, along with the correct planetary system temperature and distance from the star, are keys to planet and planetesimal formation. To date, the Solar System, with 8 planets, 5 dwarf planets and 5 planetesimal systems, is the largest planetary system found. Most proplyds develop into a system with no planetesimal systems, or into one very large planetesimal system.

Proplyds in other star-forming regions 

Photoevaporating proplyds in other star forming regions were found with the Hubble Space Telescope. NGC 1977 currently represents the star-forming region with the largest number of proplyds outside of the Orion Nebula, with 7 confirmed proplyds. It was also the first instance where a B-type star, 42 Orionis is responsible for the photoevaporation. In addition, 4 clear and 4 candidate proplyds were discovered in the very young region NGC 2024, two of which have been photoevaporated by a B star. The NGC 2024 proplyds are significant because they imply that external photoevaporation of protoplanetary disks could compete even with very early planet formation (within the first half a million years). 

Another type of photoevaporating proplyd was discovered with the Spitzer Space Telescope. These cometary tails represent dust being pulled away from the disks. Westerhout 5 is a region with many dusty proplyds, especially around HD 17505. These dusty proplyds are depleted of any gas in the outer regions of the disk, but the photoevaporation could leave an inner, more robust, and possibly gas-rich disk component of radius 5-10 astronomical units.

The proplyds in the Orion Nebula and other star-forming regions represent proto-planetary disks around low-mass stars being externally photoevaporated. These low-mass proplyds are usually found within 0.3 parsec (60,000 astronomical units) of the massive OB star and the dusty proplyds have tails with a length of 0.1 to 0.2 parsec (20,000 to 40,000 au). There is a proposed type of intermediate massive counterpart, called proplyd-like objects. Objects in NGC 3603 and later in Cygnus OB2 were proposed as intermediate massive versions of the bright proplyds found in the Orion Nebula. The proplyd-like objects in Cygnus OB2 for example are 6 to 14 parsec distant to a large collection of OB stars and have tail lengths of 0.11 to 0.55 parsec (24,000 to 113,000 au). The nature of proplyd-like objects as intermediate massive proplyds is partly supported by a spectrum for one object, which showed that the mass loss rate is higher than the mass accretion rate. Another object did not show any outflow, but accretion.

Gallery

See also
Wiki commons photos: Bright and dark proplyds in the Orion Nebula
 Grand tack hypothesis
 Formation and evolution of the Solar System
 Nice model
 Planetary migration
 Late Heavy Bombardment
 Photoevaporation

References

Astronomy
Orion (constellation)